Rogljevo (Serbian Cyrillic: Рогљево) is a village in the municipality of Negotin, Serbia. According to the 2002 census, the village has a population of 183 people. Along with the nearby village of Rajac, it is known for historic wine cellars.

References

Populated places in Bor District